Bil Pey-e Abu ol Hasan Kola (also Romanized as Bīl Pey-e Abū ol Ḩasan Kolā) is a village in Gatab-e Jonubi Rural District, Gatab District, Babol County, Mazandaran Province, Iran. At the 2006 census, its population was 493, in 119 families.

References 

Populated places in Babol County